Yerasimakis "Maki" Petratos (born 11 September 2000) is an Australian professional footballer who plays as a midfielder for St George City in NPL NSW.

Club career

Newcastle Jets
In June 2019, Petratos signed a scholarship contract with Newcastle Jets. In September 2020, Petratos signed a 2-year contract extension, together with his brother Kosta. Half-a-year later, he left the club.

Heidelberg United
After a brief spell in Greece, Petratos along with his brother Kosta signed with NPL Victoria club Heidelberg United. The two brothers helped The Bergers qualify to the Elimination Finals but losing on penalties to the eventual winners, Oakleigh Cannons.

Personal life
Petratos is of Greek ancestry, and comes from a footballing family. His father Angelo played as a defender for Sydney Olympic FC, his older brothers Dimitri and Kosta are his teammates at the Jets, while his younger sister Panagiota previously played for the Newcastle W-League team in 2021.

References

External links

2000 births
Living people
Australian soccer players
Association football midfielders
Central Coast Mariners FC players
Newcastle Jets FC players
National Premier Leagues players
A-League Men players
Heidelberg United FC players
Soccer players from Sydney
Australian people of Greek descent
A.E. Karaiskakis F.C. players
Super League Greece 2 players
Australian expatriate soccer players
Australian expatriate sportspeople in Greece
Expatriate footballers in Greece